Benjamin Hord Boensch (March 13, 1893 – December 19, 1924) was a college football player. He was the quarterback for the Vanderbilt Commodores football team in 1913. Some writers selected him All-Southern that season. Boensch kicked the extra point to beat Tennessee 7 to 6. He named for his grandfather Ben M. Hord, a major for the Confederacy in North Carolina.

See also
1913 College Football All-Southern Team

References

External links

American football quarterbacks
Vanderbilt Commodores football players
1924 deaths
1893 births
Players of American football from Nashville, Tennessee
All-Southern college football players